Mount Zion Lodge Masonic Temple is a historic Masonic lodge building located at 304 E. Main St. in West Plains, Howell County, Missouri. It was designed by architect Rudolph Zerse Gill and built in 1933.  The one-story building on a raised basement is an "austere" Classical Revival building with a projecting temple front with Tuscan order pilasters.  It measures approximately 50 feet by 80 feet.

It was listed on the National Register of Historic Places in 2011.

References

External links
Candidacy article with photo

Clubhouses on the National Register of Historic Places in Missouri
Buildings and structures in Howell County, Missouri
Masonic buildings in Missouri
Neoclassical architecture in Missouri
Masonic buildings completed in 1933
National Register of Historic Places in Howell County, Missouri
1933 establishments in Missouri